Roland "Pato" Vargas-Aguilera (born December 7, 1979 in Santa Cruz de la Sierra) is a Bolivian footballer. He currently plays as a midfielder for Virginia Beach United in USL League Two.

Career

Youth
Aguilera began his career in his native Bolivia, attending the prestigious Tahuichi Academy (which also produced Marco Etcheverry and Jaime Moreno), before moving to the United States to play soccer in 2000.

Professional
Aguilera was drafted in the 2000 MLS SuperDraft by the Columbus Crew. He went on to play for several teams in both Major League Soccer and the USL First Division, spending extended periods of time with the Virginia Beach Mariners and the Rochester Raging Rhinos.

In 2008 and played in 23 matches for the Montreal Impact. In 2008, he was loaned to the Impact's farm team the Trois-Rivières Attak of the Canadian Soccer League where he made his debut on June 27, 2008 in a 4–0 victory over TFC Academy. He recorded his first and second goal for Attak the next day on June 28 against TFC Academy in a 3–0 victory. On December 2, 2008 Impact announced the release of Aguilera.

He subsequently signed for the newly promoted USL First Division side Cleveland City Stars for the 2009 season.

References

External links
Cleveland City Stars bio
Montreal Impact bio

1979 births
Living people
Sportspeople from Santa Cruz de la Sierra
Bolivian expatriate footballers
Bolivian expatriate sportspeople in Canada
Bolivian expatriate sportspeople in the United States
Bolivian footballers
Columbus Crew players
New England Revolution players
Expatriate soccer players in Canada
Expatriate soccer players in the United States
Association football midfielders
Montreal Impact (1992–2011) players
Major League Soccer players
Rochester New York FC players
Canadian Soccer League (1998–present) players
USL First Division players
Trois-Rivières Attak players
Virginia Beach Mariners players
Cleveland City Stars players
Expatriate footballers in Thailand
A-League (1995–2004) players
Columbus Crew draft picks
Bolivian expatriate sportspeople in Thailand